Ciphr is a secure messaging company that produces encrypted phones. In 2022, it changed its reseller business model. The move was part of the attempt to clean-up its client base after a series law enforcement actions against similar companies that cater to the black market. The new model shifted responsibility to resellers of its encryption technology. The company later announced that it will cease operations after resellers refused to sell Ciphr's products due to the assumed legal liability.

References 

Cryptography companies
Secure communication